Junius Bassus may refer to:

 Junius Bassus (consul), prefect from 318-331
 Junius Bassus Theotecnius (317-359), son of the consul

See also 
 Basilica of Junius Bassus
 Sarcophagus of Junius Bassus